Ourense is a municipality in Galicia, Spain.

Ourense may also refer to:

Places
Ourense (comarca), a comarca in the province of Ourense, Galicia, Spain.
Ourense (Spanish Congress Electoral District), one of the 52 electoral districts (circunscripciones) used for the Spanish Congress of Deputies - the lower chamber of the Spanish Parliament, the Cortes Generales.
Ourense (Congress of Deputies constituency)
Ourense Cathedral, a cathedral in Ourense
Province of Ourense, a province of Galicia, Spain.
Roman Catholic Diocese of Ourense, one of the five Catholic dioceses of Galicia, Spain.

Sports
CD Ourense, a football team based in Ourense, Galicia, Spain.
CD Ourense B, a football team reserve team of CD Ourense.
Club Ourense Baloncesto, a basketball team based in Ourense, Galicia. 
Ourense FS, a futsal club based in Ourense, city of the province of Ourense, Galicia, Spain.

Other
Ourense Torcs, a pair of Iron Age artifacts found in Ourense

See also
Orense (disambiguation)